is a railway station in the city of Kanuma, Tochigi, Japan, operated by the private railway operator Tobu Railway. The station is numbered "TN-19".

Lines

Station layout

The station has two opposed side platforms serving two tracks. The platforms are linked by a footbridge.

Platforms

Adjacent stations

History
Kita-Kanuma Station opened on 10 December 1931. It became unstaffed from 1 September 1973.

From 17 March 2012, station numbering was introduced on all Tobu lines, with Kita-Kanuma Station becoming "TN-19".

Passenger statistics
In fiscal 2019, the station was used by an average of 185 passengers daily (boarding passengers only).

Surrounding area
 
 
 Kanuma Cultural Center

See also
 List of railway stations in Japan

References

External links

  

Railway stations in Tochigi Prefecture
Stations of Tobu Railway
Railway stations in Japan opened in 1931
Tobu Nikko Line
Kanuma, Tochigi